Acacia simplex is a perennial climbing tree native to islands in the western part of the Pacific Ocean as far east as Savaii. It is also found in Argentina. This tree grows up to 12 m in height.

There is no common English name, but it is called tatakia in Fiji, tatagia in Samoa, tātāngia in Tonga and Martaoui in New-Caledonia

Uses 
The tree is used as a toxin in fishing.  It incapacitates the fish, but it is apparently not harmful to people.

Phytochemicals

Bark
N-methyltryptamine
N,N-dimethyltryptamine
2-methyl-1,2,3,4-tetrahydro-β-carboline

Leafy stems
N-methyltryptamine
N,N-dimethyltryptamine
2-methyl-1,2,3,4-tetrahydro-β-carboline
N,N-formylmethyltryptamine
Traces of another unidentified alkaloid

Stem bark
Total alkaloids 3.6% of which 40% N-methyltryptamine, 22.5% N,N-dimethyltryptamine, 12.7% 2-methyl-1,2,3,4-tetrahydro-β-carboline.

Twigs
Total alkaloids 0.11%, of which
N-methyltryptamine is 26.3%, 6.2% N,N-dimethyltryptamine, 5.8% 2-methyl-1,2,3,4-tetrahyrdo-β-carboline, 1.6% N,N-formylmethyltryptamine.

See also
Psychedelic plants

References

simplex
Trees of Argentina
Trees of South America